Courtney Van Buren (born February 22, 1980) is a former American football offensive tackle who played for the San Diego Chargers and the Detroit Lions. 

He played college football at the University of Arkansas at Pine Bluff where he was an All-SWAC athlete on both the Football and Track teams. He is from St. Louis, Missouri and in 1998 graduated from Ladue Horton Watkins High School, where he played football and was  a two-time Missouri state track finalist in the shot put, placing as high as third.

 Van Buren was drafted by the San Diego Chargers in the 3rd round (80th overall) of the 2003 NFL Draft. In 2006, he signed with the Detroit Lions for one year and sustained another severe injury to his knees, which (along with his back) were problematic throughout his career, subsequently forcing him into retirement.

Off the field
Van Buren has made occasional appearances on television and radio as a color commentator, and is also very involved in various social and political causes. 

A Spring '00 initiate of the Gamma Sigma chapter of Kappa Alpha Psi fraternity. 

Courtney's parents are radio personality Doug Banks and Michelle Van Buren an executive with the U.S. Department of Housing and Urban Development.

References  
  

1980 births
Living people
Ladue Horton Watkins High School alumni
Players of American football from St. Louis
American football offensive tackles
Arkansas–Pine Bluff Golden Lions football players
San Diego Chargers players
Detroit Lions players